ANSF may refer to:
Agenzia Nazionale per la Sicurezza delle Ferrovie, an Italian government agency overseeing the safety of the country's rail system
Afghan National Security Forces, the uniformed military and security forces of the Islamic Republic of Afghanistan